Emmanuel Cooper  (12 December 193821 January 2012) was a British studio potter, advocate for LGBT rights and writer on arts and crafts.

Biography
Born in Pilsley, North East Derbyshire, Cooper studied at the University for the Creative Arts. He also achieved a PhD degree at Middlesex University. He was a member of the Crafts Council and the editor of Ceramic Review. Since 1999, he was visiting Professor of Ceramics and Glass at the Royal College of Art. He was the author of many books on ceramics, including his definitive biography of Bernard Leach that was published in 2003 (Yale University Press), and was also the editor of The Ceramics Book, published in 2006.

In the early 1970s, he was also a cofounder of the Gay Left collective, and remained a prominent LGBT rights campaigner throughout his life. He also published several studies of LGBT art, including The Sexual Perspective and Fully Exposed: The Male Nude in Photography.

As a potter, Cooper's work falls into one of two general forms. In the first his vessels are heavily glazed in a volcanic form. The vessels, as a result of this heavy glazing, derive a lot of their appeal from their varied and uneven textures. In their most simple form they are very reminiscent of work by Lucie Rie. In their more extravagant forms though the vessels can be banded or use incredibly vivid colors to great effect including pink, vibrant yellow and deep reds and blues. His other form of work is much simpler in style using plain glazes, often in egg yolk yellow, occasionally spotted with gold flecks.

His work can be found in the Victoria & Albert Museum, the National Museum of Scotland and the Philadelphia Museum of Art, as well as in many private collections. He was awarded an OBE for services to art in 2002.

Cooper died in London on 21 January 2012.

References

1938 births
2012 deaths
People from Pilsley, North East Derbyshire
Alumni of the University for the Creative Arts
Alumni of Middlesex University
English potters
English ceramicists
English non-fiction writers
English biographers
English editors
Academics of the Royal College of Art
Officers of the Order of the British Empire
English LGBT rights activists
English gay artists
English gay writers
English male non-fiction writers
Gay academics